An in-kernel web server is an unlimited HTTP server that runs in kernel space or equivalent. It is also known as "accelerator".

Benefits 

 Performance: the path taken by data from a source device (i.e. a disk) to a destination device (i.e. a NIC). Proper asynchronous zero-copy interfaces would make this available from user-space.
 Scalability: with respect to number of simultaneous clients. Event notification of comparable scalability seems unlikely in user-space.

Drawbacks 

Security: Kernel processes run with unlimited privileges.
Portability. Every kernel needs a specific implementation route.
Reliability. Failure in the webserver may crash the OS.

Implementations 

illumos/Solaris: NCAkmod aka Network Cache and Accelerator (NCA) kernel module
HP-UX: NSAhttp
Linux: TUX
Mesibo In-kernel real-time messaging server
Windows NT: http.sys (part of IIS)
SPIN: http
OpenVMS: WASD.trap

See also 
 Comparison of web server software
 Service-oriented architecture
 Unikernel/Exokernel (eg. SPIN's loadable kernel modules)

References 

CITI_TR_00-4
High-Performance Memory-Based Web Servers: Kernel and User-Space Performance. Philippe Joubert, Robert B. King, Rich Neves, Mark Russinovich, John M. Tracey. IBM. T. J. Watson Research Center

Web server software